John L. Magee (c. 1820-1870s?) was an American artist, lithographer, and engraver.

Magee was born in New York.  He created lithographs for New York publishing companies and exhibited three paintings at the National Academy of Design, including The Mischievous Boy (1844).  He moved to Philadelphia sometime after 1852, where he would publish prints based on news and sports events.

References

External links

American cartoonists
19th-century American painters
American male painters
American lithographers
American engravers
19th-century American male artists